Great Southern Land may refer to:
 "Great Southern Land", a song released by the Australian band Icehouse in 1982
 Great Southern Land (album), an album released by Icehouse in 1989
 Terra Australis, one of the names given to a hypothetical continent which appeared on European maps between the 15th and 18th centuries